Management Development Institute (MDI) is private business School in India. It was established in 1973 by Industrial Finance Corporation of India and is located in Gurgaon, a commercial hub near the Indian capital of New Delhi.

Rankings

MDI was ranked 10th among management schools in India by the National Institutional Ranking Framework (NIRF) in 2020, 3rd in India by Outlook Indias Top 150 Private MBA Institutions" of 2020.

Campus

The campus is about 12  km. from Indira Gandhi International Airport, New Delhi. MDI has a campus with red brick buildings and trees. The buildings have been given names such as Gurukul, Lakshaya, Scholars, Renaissance, Parthenon etc.

Library
The MDI library has a collection of over 60,000 books, in addition to electronic resources which include e-books, journals, databases, audio-visual materials, CDs/DVDs, e-journals, reports, case studies, conference proceedings, training manuals etc.

Academics
The institute offers various post graduate diploma programmes. These include full-time post graduate programmes in management and part-time programmes such as executive programmes.. It also offers fellowship research programmes.

Exchange Program
MDI Gurgaon has one of the largest exchange programmes in the country where one out of every 5 students enrolled in the post graduate programmes get an opportunity to study abroad for one or two terms. It has partner institutes in more than 34 countries  with institutes such as EDHEC Business School, Copenhagen Business School, HHL Leipzig Graduate School of Management, Bocconi University, RSM Erasmus University, ESCP Europe.

References

Business schools in Haryana
Universities and colleges in Gurgaon
Educational institutions established in 1973
1973 establishments in Haryana